Keuka Lake is one of the major Finger Lakes in the U.S. state of New York. It is unusual because it is Y-shaped, in contrast to the long and narrow shape of the other Finger Lakes. Because of its shape, it was referred to in the past as Crooked Lake. Keuka means "canoe landing" or "lake with an elbow" in the Seneca language.

Description

The Y-shaped Keuka Lake empties into another Finger Lake, Seneca Lake, through a stream called Keuka Lake Outlet at the lake's northeastern end in Penn Yan. The stream empties into Seneca Lake at the village of Dresden.  At one time the outlet was developed into a canal, the Crooked Lake Canal, connecting the lakes.  This canal was later replaced by a railroad branch line which is now a hiking and cycling trail, the Keuka Outlet Trail.

Ecology
This body of water possesses large and healthy populations of lake trout, brown trout, rainbow trout, landlocked salmon, smallmouth bass, largemouth bass, and yellow perch.  The productive fishery is supported by huge numbers of baitfish, most notably alewives (sawbellies), and is a very popular lake with area fishermen.

Humans, fish, and wildlife depend on the rich ecology of the lake habitat. The complex ecosystem is subject to contamination of the watershed, largely by storm water runoff. The Keuka Lake Association (KLA) monitors the water of the lake to ensure that it is suitable for its many uses, such as drinking, fishing, and swimming. Tributary streams, groundwater, and the lake itself are regularly tested for water quality. Additionally, KLA collects and publishes data about the lake level.

The infestation of European zebra mussels, which has impacted many North American bodies of water, has also affected Keuka Lake and other Finger Lakes in New York. In addition to disrupting the lake's ecosystem, zebra mussels can be a nuisance to lakeside homeowners. Their small size enables them to clog water intake pipes.  Furthermore, their sharp shells can cause lacerations on the feet of bathers.  Bathers may wish to wear water shoes when swimming in the lake.

Surroundings

The village of Penn Yan is at the northeastern tip of the lake, and Branchport is at the northwestern tip.  Hammondsport lies at the south end of the lake.  Hammondsport was the home of Glenn Curtiss, a pioneer of naval aviation, and is now the site of the Glenn H. Curtiss Museum.

While the shore of the lake is primarily residential, Keuka College is located in Keuka Park on the western shore of the east branch and Keuka Lake State Park is located on the eastern side of the northwest branch of the lake. Camp Iroquois, run by the New York State Sheriffs Institute, is located on the eastern side of the bluff. YMCA Camp Cory is located on the eastern side of the northeast branch of the lake. Camp Good Days and Special Times is located on the western side of the northwest branch of the lake. Garrett Memorial Chapel is located near the tip of the bluff between the two branches.

An important component of the economy of this region is based on grape growing and wine production.

Wine trail
These vineyards are included in the Keuka Lake Wine Trail:

The winery on the lake, but not listed on the official Keuka Lake Wine Trail, is Domaine Leseurre.

See also

 The Bluff Point Stoneworks

References

Further reading
 Beautiful Keuka Lake, from the Elmira Daily Advertiser, 1902
 Along the Outlet of Keuka Lake, by Frances Dumas
 An Excursion on the Keuka Maid, by Richard Sherer
 The Mary Bell: The Queen of Lake Keuka, from the Hammondsport Herald, 1892
 Keuka Cottage Boy, by Robert V. Anderson

External links

 Keuka Lake Association
 NYS-DEC: Keuka Lake information
 Keuka Lake Outlet Trail
 New York State Parks: Keuka Lake State Park

Finger Lakes
Lakes of Yates County, New York
Tourist attractions in Yates County, New York
Lakes of Steuben County, New York
Tourist attractions in Steuben County, New York
Lakes of New York (state)